Lázaro Carrasco (died 20 Nov 1562) was a Roman Catholic prelate who served as Bishop of Nicaragua (1556–1562).

Biography
In 1556, Lázaro Carrasco was appointed during the papacy of Pope Paul IV as Bishop of Nicaragua and arrived in Nicaragua in 1557. He was never consecrated bishop and died on 20 Nov 1562 as Bishop Elect of Nicaragua.

See also
Catholic Church in Nicaragua

References

External links and additional sources
 (for Chronology of Bishops) 
 (for Chronology of Bishops) 

16th-century Roman Catholic bishops in Nicaragua
Bishops appointed by Pope Paul IV
1562 deaths
Roman Catholic bishops of León in Nicaragua